Tennis at the Friendship Games took place at the Baildon Katowice courts in Katowice, Poland between 20 and 26 August 1984. 4 events (2 men's and 2 women's) were contested.

Medal summary

Men's events

Singles semifinals and final

Women's events

Singles semifinals and final

Medal table

See also
 Tennis at the 1984 Summer Olympics

References

Friendship Games
Friendship Games
Tennis tournaments in Poland
Sport in Katowice
Friendship Games